Gregory Cusack (born May 6, 1943) is an American politician who served in the Iowa House of Representatives from the 81st district from 1973 to 1981.

References

1943 births
Living people
Democratic Party members of the Iowa House of Representatives